The 1902 Norwegian Football Cup was the first season of the Norwegian annual knockout football tournament. This was an invitation tournament organised by Kristiania IF and NFF, which was later given official status. Five teams joined this competition, and Odd reached the final without playing a match. Grane won the tournament.

First round

|colspan="3" style="background-color:#97DEFF"|1 June 1902

|}

Odd received a bye.

Semi-finals

|colspan="3" style="background-color:#97DEFF"|15 June 1902

|}

Odd received a bye.

Final

{| width=100%
|valign=top width=50%|

References

External links
RSSSF Norwegian Football Archive

Norwegian Football Cup seasons
Norway
Football Cup